Machava is a surname of Mozambican origin. Notable people with the surname include:

 Creve Armando Machava (born 1996), Mozambican athlete
 Maria Machava (born 2004), Mozambican sailor
 Paulo Machava (1954/5–2015), Mozambican journalist

Mozambican surnames